The Awakino River is a river located in the North Island of New Zealand. It has been described as one of the great rivers in the North Island providing top-quality backcountry fishing. Awakino township lies on its river banks.

River route
The river rises in the rugged bush country of the King Country and flows south via the settlement of Mahoenui from where it runs alongside State Highway 3 to the Tasman Sea at Awakino.

References

Waitomo District
Rivers of Waikato
Rivers of New Zealand